Donato De Ieso (born 27 February 1989 in Pago Veiano) is an Italian former cyclist, who rode professionally in 2013 and 2014, exclusively for the  team.

Palmarès
2011
Coppa San Sabino
Trophée Rigoberto Lamonica
2012
Trophée Salvatore Morucci

References

External links

1989 births
Living people
Italian male cyclists
Cyclists from Campania
Sportspeople from the Province of Benevento